Arnica mollis is a North American species of arnica in the sunflower family, known by the common name soft arnica, or hairy arnica. It is native to Canada (British Columbia, Alberta, Quebec, and all 3 Arctic territories) and the United States (Alaska and the western mountains as far south as San Bernardino County, California and Rio Arriba County, New Mexico. There are also isolated populations in the White Mountains of Coos County, New Hampshire. The species grows in subalpine mountain habitat such as meadows and streambanks.

Arnica mollis is a perennial herb producing one or more hairy, glandular, mostly naked stems 20 to 60 centimeters tall. There are 3 to 5 pairs of leaves along mainly the lower half of the stem, each oblong in shape and 4 to 20 centimeters in length.

The inflorescence holds one to a few daisylike flower heads with centers of yellow disc florets and fringes of yellow ray florets. The fruit is an achene with a brownish pappus.

"Mollis" means "soft", referring to the soft hairs on the leaves.

References

External links

Jepson Manual Treatment
United States Department of Agriculture Plants Profile
Southwest Colorado Wildflowers Photo Profile
Calphotos Photo gallery, University of California

mollis
Plants described in 1834
Flora of Subarctic America
Flora of Western Canada
Flora of the Northwestern United States
Flora of the Southwestern United States
Flora without expected TNC conservation status